Neocollyris bicolor is a species of ground beetle in the genus Neocollyris in the family Carabidae. It was described by Horn in 1902.

References

Bicolor, Neocollyris
Beetles described in 1902
Taxa named by Walther Horn